Biche was an 8-gun  of the French Navy.

She took part in the Expédition d'Irlande and in the Battle of Tory Island.

She was decommissioned in 1803.

Age of Sail naval ships of France
1798 ships
Ships built in France